This is a list of the European Hot 100 Singles and European Top 100 Albums number ones of 2008, as published by Billboard magazine.

Chart history

References

Europe
2008
2008